Ecklonia kurome ( (kurome)) is a brown alga species in the genus Ecklonia found in the Sea of Japan.

The phlorotannins eckol, phlorofucofuroeckol A and 8,8'-bieckol can be found in Ecklonia kurome.

An oligosaccharide extract from Ecklonia kurome called  is approved in China for the treatment of Alzheimer's disease, but the evidence is highly dubious.

See also 
 Kombu

References

External links 
 algaebase.org

kurome
Plants described in 1927